Quintet is a 1979 American post-apocalyptic science fiction film directed by Robert Altman. It stars Paul Newman, Brigitte Fossey, Bibi Andersson, Fernando Rey, Vittorio Gassman and Nina Van Pallandt.

Plot
The story takes place during a new ice age. The camera tracks a blank, frozen, seemingly deserted tundra until two blurry, distant figures can just be made out. They are the seal hunter Essex (Paul Newman) and his pregnant companion, Vivia (Brigitte Fossey), the daughter of one of Essex's late hunting partners. They are traveling north, where Essex hopes to reunite with his brother, Francha (Thomas Hill).

Essex and Vivia eventually find Francha's apartment, but the reunion is short-lived. While Essex is out buying firewood, a gambler named Redstone (Craig Richard Nelson) throws a bomb into Francha's apartment, killing everyone inside, including Vivia. Essex sees Redstone fleeing the scene and chases him to the sector's "Information Room." Essex witnesses the murder of Redstone by an Italian gambler named St. Christopher (Vittorio Gassman). When St. Christopher leaves, Essex searches Redstone's pockets and finds a piece of paper with a list of names: Francha, Redstone, Goldstar, Deuca, St. Christopher, and Ambrosia.

Puzzled by the mystery, Essex discovers that Redstone had previously checked into the Hotel Electra, a gambling resort in another sector. He visits the hotel and assumes Redstone's identity. Immediately after checking in, Essex is given an unexpected welcome by Grigor (Fernando Rey), who is the dealer in the casino. Insisting that he means no harm, Grigor invites Essex (as "Redstone") to the casino, where gamblers are now heavily involved in a "Quintet" tournament. While there he meets Ambrosia (Bibi Andersson), who always assumes the role of the  "sixth player" in the game.

Essex is unaware that the current Quintet tournament is a fight for the survival of the fittest. Those who are "killed" in game are executed in real life. Grigor and St. Christopher are aware that Essex is not the real Redstone, so they ignore him and focus on the other players. Goldstar (David Langton) is the first killed, followed by Deuca (Nina Van Pallandt), until the only two players left are St. Christopher and Ambrosia. Ambrosia, however, insists that Essex be counted as a player in the game since he has assumed Redstone's identity. Grigor agrees and informs St. Christopher that he has to eliminate Essex before he can face off against Ambrosia.

Essex and St. Christopher have a showdown outside the city, where St. Christopher is killed by falling into a rupture of the ice sheet. Essex returns to Francha's apartment and finds the same list that Redstone had. Ambrosia follows Essex to the apartment. Essex slits her throat moments before her attempt to slit his throat.

Returning to the Hotel Electra to cremate Ambrosia's body, Essex confronts Grigor to demand his "prize", since he was the winner of Quintet. Grigor reveals that the only prize is the thrill of the game itself. Grigor insists he stay and participate in future tournaments, but a disgusted Essex condemns Quintet and leaves the hotel for good. The film ends with Essex taking a long walk out into the barren distance.

Cast

 Paul Newman as Essex
 Vittorio Gassman as Saint Christopher
 Fernando Rey as Grigor
 Bibi Andersson as Ambrosia
 Brigitte Fossey as Vivia, Essex's Wife
 Nina Van Pallandt as Deuca
 David Langton as Goldstar
 Thomas Hill as Francha
 Monique Mercure as Redstone's Mate
 Craig Richard Nelson as Redstone
 Maruska Stankova as Jaspera
 Anne Gerety as Aeon
 Michel Maillot as Obelus
 Max Fleck as Wood Supplier
 Françoise Berd as Charity house woman

Production
Robert Altman came up with the original idea but said he wanted Walter Hill to write and direct the film.

Quintet was filmed in early 1978 on the site of Montreal's Expo 67 world's fair. The extreme cold made the shoot challenging for the cast and crew. The soundtrack was recorded by the New York Philharmonic.

At the time of the film's release, 20th Century Fox president Alan Ladd Jr. told Variety that Altman was not given final cut on what he termed "a complicated picture."

Reception
According to a report in Daily Variety, the film was "a financial disaster."

Reviews were mostly negative. Roger Ebert gave the film two stars out of four, calling it "a puzzlement, and not a very interesting one." Gene Siskel awarded one-and-a-half stars out of four, writing "These are metaphors that college filmmakers wouldn't consider making into movies, but Altman somehow considers this profound. Actually, his script is derivative of the Italian comedy The Tenth Victim and Harlan Ellison's sci-fi parable A Boy and His Dog." Variety called it "Robert Altman's latest impenetrable exercise in self-indulgence."

Stanley Kauffmann of The New Republic described Quintet as- 'paralyzingly stupid: stupefied with a mumbling guttural prententiousness'.

Vincent Canby of The New York Times wrote "Quintet is depressing not because it's about the end of the world, but because its artistic vision is feeble. Yet it's the work of one of the most original, vital, enterprising directors of our time. How to reconcile these facts? I'm not sure they can be." Gary Arnold of The Washington Post declared "Robert Altman's 'Quintet, now at area theaters, earns a little five-sided niche next to Zardoz and The Heretic in the '70s memory album of pseudo-profound fiascoes." Pauline Kael of The New Yorker lamented that Altman was "giving weight to scenes that he would have treated as comedy skits only a few years ago ... with dialogue such as the diabolical Gassman's 'Hope is an obsolete word,' contrasted with the inspirational music as Newman presses on northward, it's like a Monty Python show played at the wrong speed."

Charles Champlin of the Los Angeles Times, however, wrote in a positive review:
"It invites easy charges that it is self-indulgent and pretentious. Yet I am bound to say that I was fascinated by it. Like it or not, it is a true tour de force of film-making, an exercise in tone and atmosphere sustained from start to finish."

Jack Kroll wrote in Newsweek: "It's clear that the game of Quintet is Altman's metaphor for the erosion of art, philosophy and the humane activities of civilization. That's one of the weaknesses of the film - the game itself can't bear this symbolic weight ... But this is transcended by the strong acting and by the great beauty and hyponotic rhythm of the film."

On Rotten Tomatoes, the film has an approval rating of 20% based on 10 reviews.

References

External links
 Quintet fan page
 
 
 
 

1979 films
1970s science fiction films
American science fiction films
1970s English-language films
Films directed by Robert Altman
Films with screenplays by Patricia Resnick
American post-apocalyptic films
American dystopian films
Films shot in Montreal
Films about gambling
Films about death games
20th Century Fox films
1970s American films